Stelios Tsoukanis (born 27 February 1990) is a Greek professional footballer who plays as a left-back for Super League 2 club Makedonikos.

Career
Tsoukanis started his career in youth teams of Anagennisi Epanomi, and in summer 2011, after a trial, he joined Aris after a recommendation of then-coach Sakis Tsiolis. He played 6 matches in his first season to Aris, due to an injury of first-choice left back Michel Garbini Pereira. He played very good and earned congratulations, despite some mistakes that he made due to inexperience.

References

External links

Myplayer.gr Profile

1990 births
Living people
Greek footballers
Gamma Ethniki players
Super League Greece players
Football League (Greece) players
Super League Greece 2 players
Aris Thessaloniki F.C. players
Niki Volos F.C. players
OFI Crete F.C. players
PGS Kissamikos players
Apollon Pontou FC players
AO Chania F.C. players
Makedonikos F.C. players
Association football midfielders
Association football defenders
Footballers from Thessaloniki